"Isaac" is a song recorded by Hollyn as the B-side for the song "Everything and More".

Background
The song is inspired by the story of Abraham sacrificing Isaac in Genesis 22. Hollyn explained "I reflected upon this story, I realized how much it related to what I was going through. This song is about giving something that God gave you back to Him, even if it hurts."

"Isaac" impacted Christian radio on October 23, 2018.

Composition
"Isaac" is originally in the key of G Major, with a tempo of 92 beats per minute.

Commercial performance
"Isaac" peaked at No. 37 on the Billboard Christian Airplay chart. The song spent four weeks on the chart.

Track listings
Digital download
"Everything and More" featuring Aaron Cole  — 3:17
"Isaac" — 4:00

Music video
A music video for "Isaac" was released on October 18, 2018, and was directed by Ezra Cohen. The video shows Hollyn singing the song in a bedroom while she is dancing. The video has over half a million views on YouTube. A commentary video was released on October 31, 2018.

Charts

Release history

References 

2018 singles
2018 songs
Gospel songs
American pop songs
Contemporary Christian songs